(born January 25, 1994, in Tokyo), better known as his stage name Hiro, is a Japanese singer and the lead vocalist of the Japanese rock band My First Story.

Personal life 

Hiro was born on January 25, 1994, the youngest son of Japanese singers Masako Mori and Shinichi Mori. He has two elder brothers, the eldest of whom is Takahiro Moriuchi, the lead singer of the band One Ok Rock and Tomohiro Moriuchi who works on TV Tokyo. In April 2005, his parents divorced when he was 11. Following the divorce, he and his older brother, Tomohiro, resided with their father; their mother took custody of their oldest brother, Takahiro.

Career

2002–2005: Career beginnings and other musical pursuits 

Hiro signed with Johnny's Entertainment on December 1, 2002, when he was 8 years old. He was the youngest Johnny's Jr. and remained active until 2005.

2011–present: MY FIRST STORY 

He is currently active as the lead vocalist of the Japanese rock band, My First Story, which was formed in Shibuya in 2011. He released his solo debut album Sing;est on January 20, 2021, through Universal Music Japan. It contains ten covers of songs originally performed by exclusively female vocalists.

Discography

Solo

Albums

Collaborations

Appearances on music videos

References

External links
 Official MY FIRST STORY website 
 Official MY FIRST STORY Facebook 
 Official MY FIRST STORY Twitter
 Official MY FIRST STORY Instagram
 Official MY FIRST STORY Member's Club STORYTELLER

1994 births
Japanese male rock singers
Japanese singer-songwriters
Living people
Singers from Tokyo
21st-century Japanese singers
21st-century Japanese male singers